Cisthene triplaga is a moth of the family Erebidae from Paraguay. It was described by George Hampson in 1905. Hampson originally placed this species in the genus Illice. Hampson named another species in the same publication, from the same locality, as Cisthene triplaga, and this second species is presently placed in the genus Brycea, as Brycea triplaga.

References

Cisthenina
Moths described in 1905